The following elections occurred in the year 1997.

Africa
 1997 Algerian legislative election
 1997 Burkinabé parliamentary election
 1997 Cameroonian parliamentary election
 1997 Cameroonian presidential election
 1997 Chadian parliamentary election
 1997 Djiboutian parliamentary election
 1997 Gambian parliamentary election
 1997 Kenyan general election
 1997 Liberian general election
 April 1997 Malian parliamentary election
 July 1997 Malian parliamentary election
 1997 Malian presidential election
 1997 Mauritanian presidential election
 1997 Moroccan general election

Asia
 1997 Balochistan provincial assembly election
 1997 Indian presidential election
 1997 Indonesian legislative election
 1997 Iranian presidential election
 1997 Pakistani general election
 1997 Philippine barangay election
 1997 Singaporean general election
 1997 South Korean presidential election
 1997 Indian presidential election
 1997 Yemeni parliamentary election

Europe
 1997 Albanian parliamentary election
 1997 Andorran parliamentary election
 1997 Bulgarian parliamentary election
 1997 Croatian presidential election
 1997 Croatian Chamber of Counties election
 1997 Irish general election
 1997 Irish presidential election
 1997–1998 Lithuanian presidential election
 1997 Montenegrin presidential election
 1997 Norwegian parliamentary election
 1997 Polish parliamentary election
 1997 Serbian general election
 1997 Serbian presidential election
 1997 Slovenian presidential election

France
 1997 French legislative election

Germany
 1997 Hamburg state election

Spain
 1997 Galician regional election

United Kingdom
 1997 Beckenham by-election
 Blair Babe
 1997 Conservative Party leadership election
 Richard Huggett
 List of MPs elected in the 1997 United Kingdom general election
 1997 United Kingdom local elections
 1997 Paisley South by-election
 1997 Scottish devolution referendum
 1997 United Kingdom general election
 1997 Uxbridge by-election
 1997 Winchester by-election
 1997 Wirral South by-election

United Kingdom local
 1997 United Kingdom local elections
 1997 Northern Ireland local elections

English local
 1997 Wiltshire County Council election

North America
 1996–97 Belizean municipal elections

Canada
 1997 Alberta general election
 1997 Canadian federal election
 1997 Progressive Conservative Party of New Brunswick leadership election

Ontario municipal
 1997 Ontario municipal elections
 1997 Brantford municipal election
 1997 Hamilton, Ontario municipal election
 1997 Ottawa municipal election
 1997 Ottawa-Carleton Regional Municipality elections
 1997 St. Catharines municipal election
 1997 Sudbury municipal election
 1997 Toronto municipal election
 1997 Windsor municipal election

Caribbean
 1997 Jamaican general election

Mexico
 1997 Mexican legislative election

United States

United States mayoral
 1997 Houston mayoral election
 1997 Los Angeles mayoral election
 1997 New York City mayoral election
 1997 Pittsburgh mayoral election

United States gubernatorial
 1997 New Jersey gubernatorial election
 1997 United States gubernatorial elections
 1997 Virginia gubernatorial election

Oceania
 1997 Papua New Guinean general election

Australia
 1997 Fraser by-election
 1997 Northern Territory general election
 1997 South Australian state election
 1997 Sutherland state by-election

South America
 1997 Argentine legislative election
 1997 Bolivian presidential election
 1997 Falkland Islands general election
 1997 Guyanese legislative election
 1997 Honduran general election
 1997 Salvadoran legislative election

See also

 
1997
Elections